Cherai Beach is a beach located in Cherai in the northern side of Vypin Island, a suburb of the city Kochi in the state of Kerala, India. One of the most visited beaches in the state, it is situated at around 25 km (15 mi) from downtown Kochi and 20 km (12 mi) from Cochin International Airport.

Tourism 
The beach is around 10 km long and is ideal for swimming as the tide is mostly low and the waves are gentle. It is known for frequent dolphin sightings. It is one of the few places where the backwaters and the sea can be seen in a single frame. Cherai Beach offers the less busier and cleaner option accessible to Kochi and always attract the tourists from around and other states as well.

Images of Cherai beach
 Satellite image of the beach

References

External links 

Beaches of Kerala
Tourist attractions in Ernakulam district
Tourist attractions in Kochi